Lout is an EP by English rock band The Horrors. It was released on 12 March 2021 by Wolf Tone Records.

Release
On 23 February 2021, the Horrors announced they were releasing a new EP.

Critical reception
Lout was met with "generally favorable reviews" from critics. At Metacritic, which assigns a weighted average rating out of 100 to reviews from mainstream publications, this release received an average score of 80 based on 6 reviews.

In a review for Beats Per Minute, John Amen wrote: "While Lout offers only a sampling of The Horrors' latest direction, it's one that will hopefully be further developed on a full-length release. Even though there are only three tracks here, and a total of approximately 12 minutes of music, Lout represents some of The Horrors' most expressive, uninhibited, and memorable work." Liam Egan at Clash wrote: "The Horrors have released their heaviest material to date on this unhinged EP. Badwan's vocals are nasty and coarse, with proceedings momentarily taking a slight diversion into the occult as ominous grouped vocals soar over the track - to then be crushed under the weight under Lout's instrumentation." Lisa Wright of DIY said "The Horrors are out, having made their boldest, most exciting switch-flip in years."

Track listing

References

External links
 
 

2021 EPs
The Horrors EPs